Jóbson de Brito Gonzaga (born 27 April 1994), better known as Maracás, is a Brazilian professional footballer who plays for Paços de Ferreira on loan from Al-Wahda as a defender.

Professional career
Maracás made his professional debut with Vitória in a 2-0 Campeonato Brasileiro Série B loss to Sampaio Corrêa on 8 May 2015. On 14 June 2019, signed with Paços de Ferreira in the Portuguese Primeira Liga.

References

External links
 
 Profile

1994 births
Sportspeople from Bahia
Living people
Brazilian footballers
Association football defenders
Esporte Clube Vitória players
América Futebol Clube (RN) players
Sampaio Corrêa Futebol Clube players
Oeste Futebol Clube players
F.C. Paços de Ferreira players
Al Wahda FC players
Campeonato Brasileiro Série B players
Campeonato Brasileiro Série C players
Primeira Liga players
UAE Pro League players
Brazilian expatriate footballers
Expatriate footballers in Portugal
Brazilian expatriate sportspeople in Portugal
Expatriate footballers in the United Arab Emirates
Brazilian expatriate sportspeople in the United Arab Emirates